The Wayne Gretzky 99 Award is awarded annually to the most valuable player in the Ontario Hockey League playoffs. It was first awarded in 1999, and is named for Wayne Gretzky. The recipient is selected by the news/sports media. The award was introduced shortly after Gretzky announced his retirement from the NHL in 1999. He played for the Sault Ste. Marie Greyhounds in the 1977–78 OHL season, scoring 70 goals as a rookie, establishing an OHL record for most goals by a 16-year-old that stood until 2007.

Winners
List of winners of the Wayne Gretzky 99 Award.

See also
 List of Canadian Hockey League awards

References

External links
 Ontario Hockey League

Ontario Hockey League trophies and awards
99 Award
Awards established in 1999
1999 establishments in Ontario